Zargar is a village in Gowg Tappeh Rural District, in the Central District of Bileh Savar County, Ardabil Province, Iran. At the 2006 census, its population was 926, in 197 families.

References 

Populated places in Bileh Savar County